Rieves Boocock (born 22 September 2000) is an English professional footballer who plays as a striker.

Playing career
Boocock made his professional debut at age 18 coming on as a substitute for Alfie May in the 89th minute in a 1–3 victory at Gillingham on 29 December 2018 in the EFL League One.

He signed his first professional contract in May 2019.

At the end of August 2019 he went to Frickley Athletic, initially on a months loan. The deal was later extended until January 2020. However, the loan spell was cut short and he joined Sheffield F.C. on 13 November 2019 for one month. The deal was later extended for one month further. 

On 31 January 2020, he was loaned out to Cleethorpes Town for one month. On 11 March 2020, he then moved to Tadcaster Albion, also on loan and also for one month. At the end of the 2019-20 season, Boocock left Doncaster, as his contract expired.

Career statistics

References

External links

Living people
2000 births
Footballers from Doncaster
English footballers
Association football forwards
Doncaster Rovers F.C. players
Frickley Athletic F.C. players
Sheffield F.C. players
Cleethorpes Town F.C. players
Tadcaster Albion A.F.C. players